The  is an incomplete national expressway in Nagano Prefecture, Gifu Prefecture, and Fukui Prefecture. It is owned and operated primarily by the Ministry of Land, Infrastructure, Transport and Tourism (MLIT), but also has sections maintained and tolled by the Central Nippon Expressway Company in Nagano and Gifu. The route is signed E67 under MLIT's  "2016 Proposal for Realization of Expressway Numbering."

Naming

History
The first section of the road was built over the Aburasaka Pass between Fukui and Gifu prefectures in 1987. Since then it has been expanded in short segments with the most recent section opening at its western terminus at the Hokuriku Expressway in the city of Fukui in 2017.

Junction list

References

External links

Central Nippon Expressway Company 

Expressways in Japan
Roads in Fukui Prefecture
Roads in Gifu Prefecture
Roads in Nagano Prefecture